Hudur District is a district in the southwestern Bakool region of Somalia. Its capital is Hudur.

References

External links
 Districts of Somalia
 Administrative map of Hudur District

Districts of Somalia

Bakool